Proloy Saha (1968 – 24 March 2016) was an Indian footballer who played for East Bengal and the national team, as a defender. He was on the India national squad that won the 1993 SAARC Gold Cup.

Honours

India
SAFF Championship: 1993

References

1968 births
2016 deaths
Footballers from West Bengal
Indian footballers
India international footballers
East Bengal Club players
Association football defenders